The 1995 Jacksonville Jaguars season was the franchise's 1st season in the National Football League and the 1st under head coach Tom Coughlin. The Jaguars finished with a 4-12 record in their debut season and not making the playoffs. However, they ended the season on a high note defeating the Cleveland Browns 24-21 on December 24 of that year.

Offseason

Expansion draft

^ Made roster.

NFL draft

Personnel

Staff

Roster

Preseason

Schedule

Regular season

Schedule

Note: Intra-division opponents are in bold text.

Standings

References

 Jaguars on Pro Football Reference
 Jaguars Schedule on jt-sw.com

Jacksonville Jaguars
Jacksonville Jaguars seasons
Jackson